The Rookie is a 1959 American comedy film directed by George O'Hanlon in CinemaScope. It was the first film starring the comedy team of Tommy Noonan and Peter Marshall, they also appeared together in the 1962 film Swingin' Along.

Plot
Set in 1945, Thomas Patrick Noonan (Tommy Noonan) is a radio station page who receives an Army induction draft notice on the day World War II ends. He insists he should fulfill his military duty, and a mistake at the Pentagon results in a decommissioned stateside military facility being kept open to accommodate his basic training.

Sgt. Peter Marshall (Peter Marshall), who is in charge of shutting the camp down, is angry he has to remain in the Army, since he was planning to marry his girlfriend, movie starlet Lili Marlene (Julie Newmar). Tommy falls in love with Lili, and her press agent devises a publicity stunt for Lili to return the emotion and plan to marry him. The sergeant, who is furious about losing Lili, attempts to sabotage Tommy's basic training, but his scheme backfires and the two men find themselves stationed in Japan. Lili follows them, and through complicated circumstances the trio wind up stranded on a desert island that is soon visited by two Japanese sailors who are unaware the war has ended.

Cast
 Tommy Noonan as Pvt. Thomas Patrick Noonan
 Peter Marshall as MSgt. Pete Marshall
 Julie Newmar as Lili Marlene
 Joe Besser as Medical Corpsman
 Jerry Lester as Jerry Mann
 Claude Stroud as Col. Taylor
 Norman Leavitt as Maj. Evert
 Vince Barnett as 1st Janitor
 Herb Armstrong as Lt. Pat Sumner
 Richard Reeves as Bruce – Military Police Sergeant
 Don Corey as Cook
 Rodney Bell as 2nd Janitor
 George Eldredge as Gen. Bechtel
 Peter Leeds as Seville Quare
 Patrick O'Moore as Ship's Captain Weiss

Production
The Rookie was the first film in which Noonan and Marshall, who had appeared on television and in nightclubs during the late 1940s and 1950s, had starring roles. Their only previous film work had been a cameo appearance in Starlift in 1951.

The Rookie was intended to be the first in a series of films starring the comedy duo, who were being billed as the "new Abbott and Costello" by the studio. The two also played the Japanese sailors who encounter the American soldiers on the deserted island.

The Rookie was made by 20th Century Fox on a budget of only $158,000. Peter Marshall would later recall the television program Adventures in Paradise was the only other production being filmed at Fox during that time, and he felt the lack of activity made the studio feel like a "ghost town."

It was made by API, the unit of Robert L. Lippert who was enthusiastic about The Rookie. "Do you realise this is the first time in movie history that we've been without a male comedy team?" said Lippert.

Lippert said Julie Newmar was in the film for "oomph".

Filming took place in August 1959 under the title The Last Rookie.

Reception
Lippert said he spent $250,000 to sell the film.

The Rookie scored a strong box office performance, encouraging 20th Century Fox to rehire Noonan and Marshall for a second feature, originally titled Double Trouble but renamed Swingin' Along prior to its 1962 release. It was not successful and Noonan and Marshall broke up to pursue solo careers.

See also
 List of American films of 1959

References

External links
 
 
 
 

1959 films
American comedy films
20th Century Fox films
CinemaScope films
Military humor in film
Films set in 1945
Films scored by Paul Dunlap
Publicity stunts in fiction
1950s English-language films
1950s American films